Qixingguan District is the seat of the city of Bijie, Guizhou province, People's Republic of China.

On 10 November 2011, Bijie Prefecture was converted to a prefecture-level city, and the former Bijie City was rechristened Qixingguan District. Government officials hope that Qixingguan will become a distribution centre for all of southwest China and a base for new industries and tourism.

Geography
Qixingguan is located in northwestern Guizhou, with longitude ranging from 104° 51′ to 105° 55′ E, latitude 27° 03′ to 27° 46′ N, with elevations generally above . It borders Sichuan and Yunnan.

Administration
There are 6 sub-districts, 27 towns, 2 townships, and 6 ethnic townships under the administration of Bijie City:

References

External links

Geography of Guizhou
County-level divisions of Guizhou
Bijie